Bab El Kantra Bridge is one of eight famous high-level bridges that cross the Rhumel River gorge in Constantine, Algeria. The Kantara bridge is the oldest and has taken several different forms over the years: from a 1792 Ottoman-style multi-arch bridge, to an 1863 French iron arch, to its current form as a concrete arch bridge. Like the higher Sidi M'Cid Bridge, there is a unique, natural “bridge” almost directly under the span that blocks much of the river from view. Partial remains of the earlier stone bridges can still be seen on top of this natural bridge.

History
 ('the bridge') was Constantine's main access route. It is the site of the main assaults on the city. In 1185 all the Roman bridges were destroyed. Only El Kantara is rehabilitated. In 1304 it was destroyed again.

Between 1771 and 1792 Salah Bey, one of the most famous rulers of the city, promoted a good number of urbanization works and mosques. He entrusted the reconstruction of the Roman bridge to the Balearic builder Bartolomeo. To carry it out, he started from the foundations and ruins of the ancient bridge, and completed it with stone from the ruins of the ancient Roman amphitheater. The bridge roughly reproduces the configuration of the Roman original. The new reconstruction reduces the number of arches, solidifies the arches of the intermediate level and also re-establishes the siphon that supplies the city from Djebel Ouahch.

The Ottoman reconstruction is described in the 1853 testimony of Charboneau:

Thus, the similarities between the description and the documentary images of the mid-19th century are evidenced: those taken in 1856 by John Beasley Greene, a photographer and archaeologist known for his travels to Egypt and the East.

 In 1836, during the first French attack against the city which is known as the Battle of Constantine, General Camille Alphonse Trézel's troops attempted to blow up the door which closed the bridge. The assault is repulsed and many soldiers are rushed into the gorges.
 On March 18, 1857, the bridge collapsed after the passage of an invading French infantry detachment. The aqueduct is also washed away in the landslide and the city's main source of water was cut off.
 In 1863 and after three years of work and remodelled at the beginning of the 20th century. The district near the bridge is called  in Arabic, which means 'the bridge door', because the bridge was indeed closed by a door. The elements of this door still exist and are stored on solid ground along the road to the Corniche. 
 In 1951, part of the cast iron cladding of the metal arch having collapsed, the municipality took the opportunity to undertake major works and widen both the walkways and the roadway.
 In 1952 the actual bridge was inaugurated ended at a monumental gate with two stone arches that defended the entrance to the city. The two arches of this gate were very narrow and considerably hampered traffic.

See also

 List of longest suspension bridge spans
 List of bridges by length
 List of highest bridges in the world
 List of tallest bridges in the world
 Salah Bey Viaduct
 Sidi Rached Viaduct
 Sidi M'Cid Bridge
 Mellah Slimane Bridge

References

External links 

 Images of el-Kantara in Manar al-Athar digital image archive

Arch bridges in Algeria
Bridges in Constantine, Algeria
Deck arch bridges
Landmarks in Algeria
Buildings and structures in Constantine Province
Transport in Constantine, Algeria
Bridges in Algeria
Bridges completed in 1792
Bridges completed in 1952
1952 establishments in Algeria
Ottoman architecture in Algeria
1792 establishments in the Ottoman Empire
1792 establishments in Africa
18th-century architecture in Algeria